Patricia del Cármen Verdugo Aguirre (October 20, 1947 – January 13, 2008) was a Chilean journalist, writer and human rights activist. She focused much of her investigative reporting on the human rights abuses committed by the military dictatorship of Augusto Pinochet. She was a recipient of the National Prize for Journalism and the Maria Moors Cabot Prizes.

Early life
Verdugo was born in 1947. She earned her bachelor's degree in journalism from the Pontifical Catholic University of Chile.

Career
She began working for a number of well known Chilean media outlets beginning in 1969. Her magazine employers included Hoy and Apsi.

Though she continued to work in magazines, Verdugo ultimately became well known for her books, many of which focused on human rights abuses during the military regime of Gen. Pinochet, which lasted from 1973 until 1990. Verdugo's own father was killed by the Chilean secret police in 1976. Through her work and investigative reporting, Verdugo became one of Pinochet's harshest critics.

Her most well known book, Los Zarpazos del Puma (Clawings of the Puma, was published in 1985, while Pinochet was still in power. The book recounts the extrajudicial murders of more than 70 members of the Chilean opposition between the months of October to November in 1973, shortly after Pinochet took power. The killings were carried out by a Chilean military unit called the "caravan of death," which was tasked with killing political prisoners and other "enemies" of Pinochet.

Los Zarpazos del Puma was banned by the Pinochet government when it was first released. However, black market copies were widely sold on the streets of major cities, such as Santiago, despite the ban. The book became, perhaps, the most widely read in Chile's history.

Nearly all of the claims that Verdugo put forth in Los Zarpazos del Puma was later verified as factual and correct as the result of an investigation by Chilean Judge Juan Guzman, who prosecuted Augusto Pinochet for the murder of opponents.

Death
Patricia Verdugo died of gallbladder cancer on January 13, 2008, at Catholic University Hospital in Santiago, Chile.

References

External links
The Guardian: Patricia Verdugo obituary

1947 births
2008 deaths
Military dictatorship of Chile (1973–1990)
Chilean activists
Chilean women activists
Chilean political writers
Chilean women journalists
Deaths from cancer in Chile
Maria Moors Cabot Prize winners
People from Santiago
Deaths from gallbladder cancer
20th-century Chilean women writers
20th-century Chilean non-fiction writers
21st-century Chilean women writers
21st-century Chilean non-fiction writers